Hamm is a surname

 Adam Hamm (born 1971), Former American politician 
 Bob Hamm (1934–2009), American poet
 Bob Hamm (American football) (born 1959), American football player
 Doyle Hamm (1957–2021), American man convicted of murder
 Harold Hamm (born 1945), American businessman
 Hildegard Hamm-Brücher (1921–2016), a German politician
 John Hamm (born 1938), a Canadian politician
 Jon Hamm (born 1971), an American actor
 Josip Hamm (1905–1986), a Croatian Slavist 
 Mia Hamm (born 1972), American soccer player
 Peter Hamm (1937–2019), German poet, author, journalist, editor, and literary critic
 Philip Hamm (born 1859), Former member of the Wisconsin State Assembly 
 Twin brothers who are American gymnasts
 Paul Hamm (born 1982)
 Morgan Hamm (born 1982)
 Regie Hamm (born 1967), songwriter, musician, writer
 Shannon Hamm (born 1967), a guitar player
 Stuart Hamm (born 1960), a bass player
 Theodore Hamm, founder of the Hamm%27s Brewery in St. Paul, Minnesota

See also
 Ham (surname), mainly Korean surname

Russian Mennonite surnames